Fausto Duarte (1903–1953) was a Cape Verdean writer. He lived in Guinea-Bissau.

Writings
Duarte's first work was entitled Auá: Novela negra (Black Novella) and published in 1934. He went on to write four more books and a memoir.

References

Bissau-Guinean novelists
Bissau-Guinean male writers
1903 births
1953 deaths
Cape Verdean novelists
Cape Verdean male writers
20th-century novelists
Male novelists
20th-century male writers
Cape Verdean emigrants to Guinea-Bissau